The Gang of Outlaws Tour was an American concert tour by rock band ZZ Top. Coinciding with their newly released EP Texicali, the tour visited arenas and amphitheaters from May through June 2012, supported by opening acts 3 Doors Down and Gretchen Wilson. The tour's concept was inspired by the concept of cinema and meant to stray from their previous tours, staged as an elaborate multimedia presentation. It made use of cinematic elements to instill the simulation of a feature film to the audience. The stage featured a large video screen that showed visual effects, video clips of attractive women, music videos, song lyrics and live action of the band on stage. Gang of Outlaws and Texicali were central to the group's comeback.

Consisting of 23 shows, Gang of Outlaws began in Manchester, New Hampshire on May 25, 2012 and ended in Hinckley, Minnesota on June 29, 2012. The tour was generally well-received and produced many positive reviews from critics. Despite no sellouts, the show in Estero, Florida was the highest-grossing event, selling over three-thousand tickets. Although none of ZZ Top's newer material was performed, a song from Texicali was added to the set list for the group's next tour in Europe.

Tour dates

See also
Texicali
3 Doors Down
Gretchen Wilson

External links
Gang of Outlaws Tour

ZZ Top concert tours
2012 concert tours